KJFK may refer to:

 John F. Kennedy International Airport (ICAO code KJFK)
 KJFK (AM), a radio station (1490 AM) licensed to serve Austin, Texas, United States
 KJFK-FM, a radio station (96.3 FM) licensed to serve Llano, Texas
 KJFK-LP, a low-power radio station (101.9 FM) licensed to serve Hot Springs, Montana, United States; see List of radio stations in Montana
 KZTQ (AM), a radio station (1230 AM) licensed to serve Reno, Nevada, United States known as KJFK from 2005 to 2013
 KUTX, a radio station (98.9 FM) licensed to serve Leander, Texas, known as KJFK from 1996 to 2000
 KOSB, a radio station (105.1 FM) licensed to serve Perry, Oklahoma, United States known as KJFK from 1988 to 1993

See also

 JFK (disambiguation)
 WJFK (disambiguation)